Orellia stictica is a species of tephritid or fruit flies in the genus Orellia of the family Tephritidae.

Distribution
France & Germany to Bulgaria & Ukraine, Sweden.

References

Tephritinae
Insects described in 1790
Diptera of Europe